Abdelmajid Lakhal (November 29, 1939 – September 27, 2014) was a Tunisian theatre and film actor and theatre director. He was considered to be a professional and versatile interpreter. Recently, he performed classical pieces (Carlo Goldoni, Anton Chekhov) translated into Arabic, at the Municipal theatre of Tunis, which were well received.
He was known on Arab Television for acting in many telefilms.

Biography

Early life 
Born in Bizerte on November 29, 1939, Lakhal lived with his family at Hammam-Lif. He performed his first role at 9 years old in 1948 in 'Khātimat al-naffāf' (The end of a morphine addict).

Career 
He says that the passion for theatre took him "...totally when he was 16 years old....". He joined the students 'Group Jeunes Comédiens', at Hammam-Lif.

In 1960 he was a student at the National Theatre of Music and Dance  of Tunis.

In 1965 he directed Molière's Georges Dandin with the al-Nuhūd Group of Tunis.

From 1966-1967 he played Flaminio from Robert Merle, Yerma from Federico García Lorca, and the Marshall from  Molière's Le Bourgeois Gentilhomme.

For the 1968 adaptation of Hamlet in the town of Hammamet, Tunisia, Lakhal was assistant director to Alì Ben Ayed. In 1971 he made his debut as a professional director with '8 Ladies' by Robert Thomas.

In 1974 he directed The Merchant of Venice (Shakespeare), and in 1982 he played Magid in 'La Noce', which was performed again at the Théâtre du Lucernaire in Paris. He worked at the creation of 'Jafabule' (Christian Le Guillochet).

He also organized tours and directed the Group of the Theatre de Tunis, which has worked three times in the 'Théâtre de la Ville' (Paris), and also in Algeria, Morocco, Libya, Vienna, Egypt, and Lebanon.

Filmography

As an actor 

1975: Il messia (of Roberto Rossellini) - 2nd Pharisee
1976: Jesus of Nazareth (of Franco Zeffirelli) - the Farisaeum
1976: Fatma 75 (of Salma Baccar)
1979: Aziza (of Abdellatif Ben Ammar)
1981: Mirages (of Abdelhafidh Bouassida)
1987: La mort en face (of Mohamed Damak)
1990: Un bambino di nome Gesù (TV Movie, of Francesco Rosi) - 2a guardia Sedeq
1991: Le vent des destins (of Ahmed Jemaï)
1993: Échec et mat (of Rachid Ferchiou)
2000: Fatma (of Khaled Ghorbal)
2000: Une Odyssée (of Brahim Babaï)
2005: Bab'Aziz - Old Calligrapher
2011: Black Gold - Old Imam (final film role)

Theatre

Non professional 
1960: Les femmes en danger of Ezzeddine Souissi
1964: George Dandin ou le Mari confondu of Molière with Renaissance Group
1974: La Vie est belle (operetta) with El Manar Group Theatre
1985: La Vie de temps à autre de Salah Zouaoui
1988: Nahar al jounun (Crazy) of Frej Slama after Taoufik Hakim with the Group of Culture of Ibn-Khaldoun.

Director 
1971: Huit Femmes of Robert Thomas. (translation)
1974: The Merchant of Venice of Shakespeare (translation), at Festival international de Carthage
1977: Noces de sang of Federico García Lorca (adaptation)
1978: Une nuit des mille et une nuits of Noureddine Kasbaoui
1979: Bine Noumine (Entre deux songes) of Ali Douagi (opérette), opening the Festival international de Monastir
1981: El Forja (The Spectacle) of Lamine Nahdi, opening the 'Festival du Printemps' at the 'Théâtre municipal de Tunis'
1985: La Jalousie de Mohamed Labidi
1986: Volpone of Jules Romains and Stefan Zweig (translation by Mohamed Abdelaziz Agrebi)
1987: Ettassouira of Abdessalem El Bech
1991: Le quatrième monde d'Abdellatif Hamrouni, opening the 'Festival national de La Goulette'
2000: El Khsouma (Baruffe a Chioggia) of Carlo Goldoni (adaptation)
2003: Fine Essaada of Taoufik Hakim (adaptation)
2005: The Seagull of Anton Chekhov (translation)

Television 

The television programs, in Tunisia started in 1966.

1967: Le quatrième acteur of Noureddine Kasbaoui
1967: Le Médecin malgré lui of  Molière
1967: L'Avare ou l'École du mensonge of Molière
1970: Interdit au public of Roger Dornès and Jean Marsan
1973: J'avoue of Hamadi Arafa
1974: Histoire d'un poème de Noureddine Chouchane
1976: Ziadatou Allah II of Ahmed Harzallah (telefilm)
1983: Yahia Ibn Omar d'Hamadi Arafa (telefilm) (1st prize for interpretation)
1984: Cherche avec nous d'Abderrazak Hammami (telefilm monthly for 4 years)
1985: El Watek bellah el hafsi of Hamadi Arafa (telefilm)
1989: Cantara of Jean Sagols (telefilm of Antenne 2)
1991: Les gens, une histoire d'Hamadi Arafa
1992: Autant en emporte le vent de Slaheddine Essid (Tunisian telefilm of 14 episodes)
1994: Par précaution de Safoudh Kochairi
1996: L'homme de la médina de Paolo Barzman
1996: Abou Raihana de Fouaz Abdelki (30 episodes)
1999-2001: Souris à la vie d'Abderrazak Hammami (twice 30 episodes)

References

External links 
 
 Official website
 Interview with Abdelmajid Lakhal

1939 births
2014 deaths
Tunisian theatre directors
People from Tunis
Tunisian male film actors
Tunisian male stage actors
20th-century Tunisian male actors
People from Bizerte